Meesha Ghoshal is an Indian actress who predominantly appears in Tamil films. After making her debut in the Tamil film Pokkisham (2009), she has appeared in ventures including A. R. Murugadoss's 7aum Arivu and Atlee's Raja Rani.

Career
Meesha Ghoshal  began her acting career, with performances in theatre, She acted in Naan Mahaan Alla (2010)  as a friend to Kajal Aggarwal before being signed up to play a supporting role in the bilingual 180 (2011) and then in A. R. Murugadoss's 7aum Arivu (2011), where she played a scientist alongside Suriya and Shruti Haasan. She was next seen in supporting roles in Myshkin's Mugamoodi and then Ishtam. She has also appeared in Raja Rani as Madhu, a friend of Nayantara's character and in Vanakkam Chennai.

In 2013, she featured in the lead role in a short film titled Akku directed by Immanuel Prakash.

Filmography

Films

Television

References

External links
 

Living people
1989 births
Actresses in Malayalam cinema
Actresses in Tamil cinema
Actresses in Telugu cinema